This is a list of tin whistle players, people known for playing the tin whistle.

Mary Bergin
Paul Brady
Cormac Breatnach
Willie Clancy
Andrea Corr of the Irish Folk band The Corrs
Brian Finnegan
 Carmel Gunning
 Tony Hinnigan
 Vinnie Kilduff
 Joanie Madden
 Michael McGoldrick
 Stephan Micus
 Paddy Moloney
 Matt Molloy
 Carlos Núñez
 Seán Potts
 Micho Russell
 Spider Stacy

See also
Tin whistle

References

Lists of musicians by instrument